Matthias Bernard Hildreth (c. 1774 – July 11, 1812) was an American lawyer and politician.

Life
His family moved in 1797 from Southampton, Long Island to Johnstown, then in Montgomery County, New York, where his father James Hildreth (d. 1818) became judge of the Court of Common Pleas.

Hildreth was a presidential elector in 1804, voting for Thomas Jefferson and George Clinton. On March 13, 1808, he married Ann Rust (ca. 1769-1821), and they had two children: James Tallmage Hildreth (1809–1857) and Catherine Mary Hildreth.

He was New York State Attorney General from 1808 to 1810, and from 1811 until his death.

He was buried at the Old Colonial Cemetery at Johnstown, N.Y.

Sources
 Info at rootsweb
 His son's obit in Iowa State Democrat, Davenport, Iowa
 Transcribed cemetery records

1770s births
1812 deaths
New York State Attorneys General
1804 United States presidential electors
People from Long Island
People from Johnstown, New York